Bruno Sanfilippo (born September 13, 1965) is an Argentine pianist and composer from Buenos Aires, Argentina. He currently resides in Barcelona, Spain. His sound has been described as an exploration of minimalist piano concepts and electroacoustic music. 
In 2015, he became one of the main exponents of the LIFEM 2015 festival, specializing in minimalist music.

Biography
The artist began playing the piano at a young age, starting with the Pleyel et Cie piano from his parents' home in Buenos Aires. Although Sanfilippo draws inspiration from various genres, in his early years, he was influenced by classical composers such as Erik Satie, Claude Debussy and Maurice Ravel. 

In 1988, Sanfilippo graduated from the Galvani Conservatory in Buenos Aires with a degree in Musical Composition.

In 2000, the artist left his native Argentina and began his life, and a new chapter of his career, in Barcelona, Spain.

Career
In 1998, Sanfilippo started Ad21 music, a personal platform/label responsible for some of his albums except, The Poet, which was signed with 1631 Recordings and Decca Publishing in 2016, and Unity through the Russian label Dronarivm in 2018.

Sanfilippo has participated in concerts and music festivals in both the national and international music scene. This includes performances at the Insolit Music Forum in Barcelona in 2007, the Stalker festival in Tallinn in 2012, the Antara Festival in London in 2013 and the LIFM festival in London in 2015.

The LIFEM 2015, or the London International Festival of Exploratory Music, was an opportunity for Sanfilippo to participate in the Minimalism Unwrapped series with fellow composers, Wim Mertens, Sylvain Chauveau and Greg Haines.

He has been lauded as an "exceptionally refined sound-sculptor" and his work has been compared to Max Richter, Arvo Pärt, Jóhann Jóhannsson, Harold Budd, and many more in the area of contemporary classical.

In pop culture
A sample of Sanfilippo's "Ambessence Piano & Drones 1" was used in Canadian rapper Drake's 2013 song "Started from the Bottom".

Discography

References

Sources
 Lifem Festival 2015 
CutCommon Mag - Inside Life
 A Closer Listen
 Peek-a-Boo BRUNO SANFILIPPO , Ten Albums That Changed My Life , ARTICLE review Online

External links
 Official Bruno Sanfilippo site
 Facebook
 Twitter
 YouTube

Living people
1965 births
Argentine pianists
Male pianists
Contemporary classical composers
Argentine composers
Electroacoustic music composers
Minimalist composers
21st-century pianists
21st-century composers